Kessler v. Treat, 205 U.S. 33 (1907), was a decision in which the Supreme Court of the United States adjudicated allegations that prisoners were unlawfully imprisoned by Morgan Treat, the United States Marshall for the Eastern District of Virginia. In a one-sentence opinion written by Chief Justice Melville Fuller, the Court identified ten cases for which the Court entered the same decree as the one issued in Tinsley v. Treat. Justice John Marshall Harlan dissented without writing a separate opinion.

Cases for which decrees were entered
The Court entered decrees for the following cases:
 
 William De. C. Kessler v. Morgan Treat, United States Marshal, el al.
 Samuel T. Morgan v. Morgan Treat, etc.
 Austin B. Carpenter v. Morgan Treat, etc.
 Fortesque Whittle v. Morgan Treat, etc.
 Frank E. Wilcox v. Morgan Treat, etc.
 George Braden v. Morgan Treat, etc.
 Frank S. Royster v. Morgan Treat, etc.
 J. Rice Smith v. Morgan Treat, etc.
 Charles F. Burroughs v. Morgan Treat, etc.
 Charles H. McDowell v. Morgan Treat, etc.

See also
 Andersen v. Treat (1898)
 List of United States Supreme Court cases, volume 205

References

External links
 

United States Supreme Court cases
1907 in United States case law
United States Supreme Court cases of the Fuller Court